The softball competition at the 2007 Summer Universiade was held at the Softball Stadium of the Srinakharinwirot University and at the Softball Field of the Thammasat University in Bangkok, Thailand, from 11 to 17 August 2007.

First stage
 Group A

 Group B

Game for the ninth place

Second stage
 Group C

 Group D

Final

Final ranking

References

External links
 
 Web page of the International Softball Federation

U
2007 Summer Universiade
Softball at the Summer Universiade